Central government spending in the United Kingdom, also called public expenditure, is the responsibility of the UK Government, the Scottish Government, the Welsh Government and the Northern Ireland Executive. In the budget for financial year 2019–20, proposed total government spending was £842 billion.

Spending per head is significantly higher in Northern Ireland, Wales and Scotland than it is in England.

Scotland has historically collected more tax per person than has the rest of the UK, although following a decline in the oil price in 2014, Scotland produced slightly less revenue than England per capita in 2014–15. As of 2014 and the release of the GERS report, Scotland had a higher deficit relative to the UK deficit as a whole and received an increased net subsidy from UK Government borrowing, this deficit was attributed to declining oil revenues as the price of crude oil has fallen. This condition is predicted to only get worse should oil revenues fall further.

Government spending

The graph shows spending by sector with prices adjusted for inflation. 'Other expenditure' includes general public services (£22bn in 2013/14), housing and community amenities (£12bn), environment protection (£12bn), recreation, culture and religion (£12bn). Accounting adjustments of £46 in 2013/14 have not been included. The spikes in 'economic affairs' and 'debt interest' were due to the financial sector interventions in the banking collapse of 2008.

Towns Fund
The Towns Fund is £1bn worth of funding to be split between 45 towns to promote regeneration as part of the 'levelling up' of disadvantaged or deprived areas. The fund has been criticised as towns that will benefit from the Fund disproportionately have a Conservative MP, with constituencies with small majorities seeming to be especially favoured.

Local government spending
Local government spending is the responsibility of local authorities, under the supervision of the respective national governments:
 English local authorities, under the supervision of the Secretary of State for Communities and Local Government
 Scottish local authorities, under the supervision of the Cabinet Secretary for Finance, Employment and Sustainable Growth
 Welsh local authorities, under the supervision of the Minister for Housing and Local Government
 Northern Ireland local authorities, under the supervision of the Minister of the Environment

See also
 Barnett Formula
 Fiscal autonomy for Scotland
 History of the English fiscal system
 People's Quantitative Easing
 Taxation in the United Kingdom
 United Kingdom budget, the budget of the UK government
 United Kingdom government austerity programme
 United Kingdom national debt

By nation
Northern Ireland fiscal deficit
Welsh fiscal deficit

International:
 Government budget by country
 List of countries by tax revenue as percentage of GDP

References